The Randen is a small mountain range located between the Jura and the Swabian Jura, north of the Rhine. Predominantly located in the Swiss canton of Schaffhausen, they culminate in the German state of Baden-Württemberg. The Randen, which belong to the Table Jura (Tafeljura), are situated north of Schaffhausen and south of Blumberg.

The highest peak is the Schlattersteig, which is part of the more prominent Hoher Randen in Germany. Other important summits are the Hage, the Lange Rande, and the Schlossranden with the Schleitheimer Randenturm in Switzerland.

References
Swisstopo topographic maps

External links

Randen on Schauffhauserland.ch

Mountain ranges of Switzerland
Mountains of the canton of Schaffhausen
Mountain and hill ranges of Baden-Württemberg
Mountains of Switzerland